Bala Qəcər (also, Bala Kadzhar and Bala Qacar) is a village and municipality in the Barda Rayon of Azerbaijan.  It has a population of 797.

References 

Populated places in Barda District